= Georges El Fakhri =

American engineer

Georges El Fakhri is an American engineer from Massachusetts General Hospital / Harvard Medical School in Boston. He was named Fellow of the Institute of Electrical and Electronics Engineers (IEEE) in 2016 for contributions to biological imaging.

El Fakhri graduated from Ecole Centrale in France, going on to get a PhD from the University of Paris XI. At Harvard Medical School, he completed his postdoctoratal training in PET and MR. He was the head of the Gordon Center for Medical Imaging at Massachusetts General Hospital (MGH.)
